ESIC Medical College, Alwar, known in full as Employees State Insurance Corporation Medical College, Alwar, is a co-educational medical college located in Alwar, Rajasthan, India. It was established (partially active) with 50 beds in operation.

History 
The college was constructed by Uttar Pradesh Rajkiya Nirman Nigam Limited in 2016 and handed over to ESIC in 2017. The college has a capacity of 500 general beds and 250 dynamic beds, but due to disputes among the authorities only a 50-bed hospital could be started.

Campus 
The medical college building is equipped with modern technology. Also, 200 flats are constructed for the doctors and staff members.

Controversy 
The medical college has been in controversy since its construction due to a dispute between centre and state governments. Till now, there is no confirmation when the college will work in full effect.

References 

Medical colleges in Rajasthan
Universities established in the 21st century
Employees' State Insurance
Affiliates of Rajasthan University of Health Sciences